The Harshman Covered Bridge near Fairhaven, Ohio, was built in 1894 by Everett S. Sherman. It was listed on the National Register of Historic Places in 1976. It was documented by the Historic American Engineering Record (HAER) in 2003.

See also
List of bridges documented by the Historic American Engineering Record in Ohio

References

External links

Covered bridges on the National Register of Historic Places in Ohio
Bridges completed in 1894
Buildings and structures in Preble County, Ohio
Historic American Engineering Record in Ohio
National Register of Historic Places in Preble County, Ohio
Tourist attractions in Preble County, Ohio
Road bridges on the National Register of Historic Places in Ohio
Wooden bridges in Ohio
Truss bridges in the United States